The 2017 Betway World Cup of Darts was the seventh edition of the PDC World Cup of Darts. It took place between 1–4 June 2017 at the Eissporthalle in Frankfurt, Germany.

The England pairing of Phil Taylor and Adrian Lewis were the reigning champions, after beating the Netherlands' Michael van Gerwen and Raymond van Barneveld 3–2 in the 2016 final. England were represented by Lewis and Dave Chisnall. However, they lost 2–0 to the Netherlands in the semi-finals.

The Netherlands went on to win their third title after beating Wales, represented by Gerwyn Price and Mark Webster, in the final 3–1.

Format
The tournament remained at 32 teams this year, with the top 8 teams are seeded and the remaining 24 teams being unseeded in the first round. Like last year, there are no groups in 2017 with the tournament being a straight knockout.

First round: Best of nine legs doubles.
Second round, quarter and semi-finals: Two best of seven legs singles matches. If the scores are tied a best of seven legs doubles match will settle the match.
Final: Three points needed to win the title. Two best of seven legs singles matches are played followed by a best of seven doubles match. If necessary, one or two best of seven legs singles matches in reverse order are played to determine the champion.

Prize money
Total prize money was increased by £50,000 from last year's tournament, to a total of £300,000.

The prize money will be per team:

Teams and seeding
The list of teams was announced on 19 April 2017, with the seeds announced on 22 May. Brazil and Latvia were due to make their debuts, with Norway and the Philippines missing from last year's tournament, but on the day of the announcement of all the teams, Latvia (who were to be represented by Madars Razma and Nauris Gleglu) withdrew and were replaced with another debutant in Switzerland. Final confirmation of all teams came on 22 May 2017.

Seeded nations 

Unseeded nations (in alphabetical order)

Results

Draw

Second round
Two best of seven legs singles matches. If the scores were tied, a best of seven legs doubles match will settle the match.

Quarter-finals
Two best of seven legs singles matches. If the scores were tied, a best of seven legs doubles match will settle the match.

Semi-finals
Two best of seven legs singles matches. If the scores were tied, a best of seven legs doubles match will settle the match.

Final
Three match wins were needed to win the title. Two best of seven legs singles matches followed by a best of seven doubles match. If necessary, one or two best of seven legs reverse singles matches are played to determine the champion.

References

2017
World Cup
PDC World Cup of Darts
Sports competitions in Frankfurt